The discography of the Brazilian band Rebeldes, a namesake of the Mexican band RBD, consists of two studio albums, one live album, one DVD, and eight singles, including 4 officers and 4 promotional.

Albums

Studio albums

Live albums

Singles

Promotional singles

Videography

Video albums

Music videos

References

Pop music group discographies